Wilfred Oldham (1879–unknown) was an English footballer who played in the Football League for Blackburn Rovers and Everton.

References

1872 births
date of death unknown
English footballers
Association football forwards
English Football League players
Everton F.C. players
Blackburn Rovers F.C. players
Padiham F.C. players
Oswaldtwistle Rovers F.C. players